The 1999 Nigerian House of Representatives elections in Kwara State was held on February 20, 1999, to elect members of the House of Representatives to represent Kwara State, Nigeria.

Overview

Summary

Results

Asa/Ilorin West 
APP candidate Gbemisola Ruqayyah Saraki won the election, defeating other party candidates.

Baruten/Kaiama 
PDP candidate Idris S. Abubakar won the election, defeating other party candidates.

Edu/Moro/Patigi 
PDP candidate Yunusa Y. Ahmed won the election, defeating other party candidates.

Ekiti/Isin/Irepodun/Oke-ero 
APP candidate Basair Bola Oni won the election, defeating other party candidates.

Ilorin East/South 
APP candidate Farouk A. O. Farouk won the election, defeating other party candidates.

Offa/Oyun/Ifelodun 
APP candidate Rauf Kolawole Shitu won the election, defeating other party candidates.

References 

Kwara State House of Representatives elections
Kwara
February 1999 events in Nigeria